Kogarkoite is a sodium sulfate fluoride mineral with formula Na3(SO4)F. It has a pale blue color, a specific gravity of about 2.67 and a hardness of 3.5. The crystal is monoclinic and is a type of naturally occurring antiperovskite. Kogarkoite is named after the Russian petrologist Lia Nikolaevna Kogarko (born 1936) who discovered the mineral.

Discovery and occurrence
Kogarkoite was first described in 1973 for an occurrence on Alluaiv Mountain, Lovozero Massif, Kola Peninsula, Russia. On Alluaiv it occurs in pegmatitic veins in nepheline syenite. It occurs with sodalite in syenite xenoliths in an alkali intrusive complex at Mont Saint-Hilaire, Canada. In Hortense Hot Spring, Chaffee County, Colorado, it occurs as a sublimate. It occurs at Lake Natron near Ol Doinyo Lengai, Tanzania and Suswa Volcano, Lake Magadi, Kenya.

See also
List of minerals
List of minerals named after people

References

Sodium minerals
Sulfate minerals
Fluorine minerals
Monoclinic minerals
Minerals in space group 11